Persian Talent Show is a reality television show competition that searches for the most talented acts across the Iranian diaspora. It is a talent show that features singers, dancers, magicians, comedians, and other performers of all ages. The program is broadcast internationally on the GLWiZ program, and is judged by Shahram Shabpareh, Behrouz Vossoughi and Faramarz Aslani. The first couple seasons have been aired from Dubai with plans to expand to locations in Europe and North America.

See also
 Persia's Got Talent

References

External links
 Persian Talent Show website
 Facebook
 Twitter

Iranian television series
Singing talent shows
2014 Iranian television series debuts
Persian-language television shows